Bahajri, or as they call in Hadramout Al Bahjeri, they are one of the families of the Wadi Dawan one of Hadhramaut's Governorate in the south of the Arabian Peninsula have known this family in ancient times (Al ibn Hajar), which is due origin to the Kingdom of Kindah  that used to be in Yemen before collapse of Marib Dam, and a move to find was scattered throughout the Arabian countries and non-Arabian countries, this family has one of the most famous and great Arabian poets, his name is Imru' al-Qais and many others poets.
this family members are also well known since ancient times to the present day in science field, poetry and Trade, and they are one of the most successful groups, one of that example is a woman, she is the Professor Dr. Suhad Bahajri and many others.

Arab clans